The Journal of Physiology is a biweekly peer-reviewed scientific journal that was established in 1878 and is published by Wiley-Blackwell on behalf of The Physiological Society. It covers research on all aspects of physiology, with an emphasis on human and mammalian physiology, including work at the molecular level, at the level of the cell membrane, single cells, tissues or organs, and systems physiology. The journal is produced both on paper and online. Accepted articles are first published online, ahead of print. The full archive back to 1878 up to issues published 12 months from the current date is freely available online. The editor-in-chief is currently Peter Kohl. According to the Journal Citation Reports, the journal has a 2021 impact factor of 6.228, ranking it ninth out of 84 journals in the category "Physiology"

History 
The Journal of Physiology was first published  in 1878 and edited by Michael Foster. In 1893–94 Foster's colleague John Newport Langley took over as editor. Langley remained the proprietor and editor until his death in 1925, when The Physiological Society bought the journal from his widow. Charles Scott Sherrington was appointed the first chairman of the editorial board in 1926. In 2003 The Physiological Society moved publishing to Blackwell, now Wiley-Blackwell. The journal is published online via the Wiley Online Library.

In 2000-2005, the journal published fraudulent research authored by Igor Dhuza, a senior research associate in Vanderbilt University's Department of Biomedical Engineering.

Previous editors-in-chief and chairmen of the editorial board

References

External links 
 

Publications established in 1878
Physiology journals
Biweekly journals
English-language journals
Wiley-Blackwell academic journals
Academic journals associated with learned and professional societies